Waterside Karori AFC is an association football club in Karori, a suburb of Wellington, New Zealand. They currently play in the Capital Football Central League.

History
Waterside Karori was formed in 1987 when Karori Swifts merged with Waterside. These two clubs had contrasting origins: Swifts were founded in 1894 from a Sunday School, and Waterside were founded in 1921 by dock workers. The current Waterside Karori club is still nicknamed Wharfies.

Waterside were originally based at Kaiwharawhara at Wellington's waterfront, a location still used by Waterside Karori. Waterside was a successful club at a national level in New Zealand in the 1930s and 1940s, winning the Chatham Cup in 1938, 1939, 1940 and 1947. However, the club was damaged by the wider effects of the 1951 waterfront strike and took years to recover.

Swifts were initially itinerant but settled in Karori in 1950, changing their name to Karori Swifts in the 1960s.

At the time of the merger, Waterside had sponsorship and was playing in the National League, but had a relatively small player base. Swifts, on the other hand, had a large player base, both senior and junior, but lacked top-level success. The merged club adopted the Waterside strip of black and white vertical stripes with the maroon Swifts strip being retained as a second strip.

In 2004 it became one of the founding principal clubs of the Team Wellington franchise in the New Zealand Football Championship.

Honours

Men's

League
Central First Division
Champions: 1970, 1971, 1973, 1977 (as Waterside), 1987, 1988 (as Swifts)
Chatham Cup: 1938, 1939, 1940, 1947 (as Waterside)

Women's

League
Women's First Division
Champions: 2011

Cup
Kelly Cup
Champions: 1992, 1997, 2009, 2011

References

External links
Waterside Karori website
New Zealand 2004/05 Season Results

Sport in Wellington City
Association football clubs in Wellington
Association football clubs established in 1988
1988 establishments in New Zealand